Olenya (also Olenegorsk) has been a major Russian Navy reconnaissance base, located on the Kola Peninsula 92 km south of Murmansk. As of 2020, units at the base are subordinate to the Long-Range Aviation branch of the Russian Aerospace Forces. The base and its staff settlement (Vysoky, Murmansk Oblast), across Lake Permusozero from the city of Olenegorsk, are served by the Olenegorsk rail station (formerly Olenya station). Olenya has served as the headquarters for 5 MRAD (Naval Reconnaissance Air Division), and has hosted two reconnaissance regiments. Its 3500-meter runway is the longest on the Kola Peninsula, making it a key facility for intercontinental flights across the North Atlantic basin.

The base is home to the 40th Composite Aviation Regiment as part of the 22nd Guards Heavy Bomber Aviation Division.

Olenya was first detected by US intelligence in 1957, and was listed as having a runway length of 3350 m (11,000 ft). The base served as a forward deployment field for Long Range Aviation and was one of nine Arctic staging facilities for nuclear strikes on the United States. An analysis in 1966 revealed 21 Tupolev Tu-16 Badger aircraft. Near the airfield is the Olenegorsk Radar Station ballistic missile early warning site, which entered service in 1971. A number of surface-to-air missile sites were operational near Olenya during the Cold War.  During the 1960s and 1970s, Olenya was used as a refueling stop on the Moscow to Havana Tupolev Tu-114 route.

As of 2006, Google Earth imagery showed nearly 40 Tupolev Tu-22M bombers on the airfield, but by 2018 only four of the aircraft appeared serviceable with another 27 aircraft awaiting disposal.

On 22 January 2019, a Tu-22M3 crash-landed after a training flight while attempting to make a landing at the Olenya air base. Two of the four crew members died in the crash, and a third died on his way to the hospital.

According to TASS, the first launch of the Kh-47M2 Kinzhal ("dagger", a nuclear-capable air-launched ballistic missile ALBM) in the Arctic took place mid-November, 2019. Reportedly, the launch was carried out by a MiG-31K from Olenya air base. The missile hit a ground target at "Pemboy" proving ground, reaching the speed of Mach 10.

On 7 October 2022, satellite photos showed 7 Tu-160 and 4 Tu-95 at the air base.

Military operations
Units stationed at the airfield since the 1990s include:
 924 MRAP (924th Naval Reconnaissance Air Regiment), operating Tupolev Tu-22M aircraft
 967 ODRAP (967th Long Range Air Reconnaissance Regiment), operating Tupolev Tu-22M aircraft
 88 OMAPIB (88th Separate Fighter Bomber Regiment), operating Mikoyan MiG-27 aircraft
 OGA (Arctic Control Group), maintaining standby facilities for Tupolev Tu-95 bomber aircraft
 458th IAP, Mikoyan MiG-31BM
In 2020, the Tu-22M3-based unit may now be the 40th Mixed Aviation Regiment operating in both  a maritime-attack and land-strike role.

References

Russian Navy
Russian Air Force bases
Soviet Naval Aviation bases
Soviet Air Force bases
Airports in Murmansk Oblast
Soviet Long Range Aviation bases